The Harvard Cyclotron Laboratory operated from 1949 to 2002. It was most notable for its contributions to the development of proton therapy.

The Harvard Cyclotron Laboratory was built with office of Naval Research funds between 1946 and 1949 to replace an earlier, lower energy, cyclotron that was sent to Los Alamos for use in the Manhattan Project.
Until 1961, the laboratory primarily performed experiments in physics. The lab performed research and development in particle physics (including particle detectors development and testing), activation analysis, radiobiology, and solid state physics. 

The use of proton particle accelerators for external beam radiotherapy was largely developed at this facility in collaboration with Massachusetts General Hospital.
From 1961 to its closing, the laboratory provided proton therapy to over 9,000 patients.
After 1974, "almost 3,000" patients were treated for ocular (eye) diseases. By the time the lab closed in 2002, its proton therapy treatments had been transferred to The Francis H. Burr Proton Therapy Center (then the Northeast Proton Therapy Center) at Massachusetts General Hospital.

See also
 List of accelerators in particle physics

References

Harvard University
Laboratories in the United States
Medical research institutes in the United States
Nuclear medicine organizations
Research institutes in Massachusetts
Research institutes established in 1949
1949 establishments in Massachusetts
2002 disestablishments in Massachusetts
Medical and health organizations based in Massachusetts